The Sokol movement (falcon) is an all-age gymnastics organization first founded in Prague in the Czech region of Austria-Hungary in 1862 by Miroslav Tyrš and Jindřich Fügner. It was based upon the principle of "a strong mind in a sound body". The Sokol, through lectures, discussions, and group outings provided what Tyrš viewed as physical, moral, and intellectual training for the nation. This training extended to men of all ages and classes, and eventually to women.

The movement also spread across all the regions populated by Slavic cultures, most of them part of either Austria-Hungary or the Russian Empire: present-day Slovakia, the Slovene Lands, Croatia, Serbia (SK Soko), Bulgaria, Poland (Sokół), Ukraine, Belarus. In many of these nations, the organization also served as an early precursor to the Scouting movements. Though officially an institution "above politics", the Sokol played an important part in the development of Czech nationalism and patriotism, which found expression in articles published in the Sokol journal, lectures held in the Sokol libraries, and theatrical performances at the gymnastic mass festivals called slets.

Early history

The idea for physical training centers was not a new one. The Sokol movement consciously traced its roots in physical education to the athletes and warriors of Ancient Greece. More directly, the nature of the Sokol was influenced by the German Turnverein, mass-based, nationalist-minded gymnastics societies founded by Friedrich Ludwig Jahn in 1811.

Miroslav Tyrš, the founder of the first Sokol in Prague in 1862, continued as the most influential figure in the movement until his death in 1884. Born Friedrich Emanuel Tirsch into a German-speaking family in 1834, Tyrš grew up under the influence of the Romantic nationalism that gave rise to the uprisings that swept across Europe in 1848. He received a thorough education at the University of Prague, where he majored in philosophy. It was not until the early 1860s that he became involved in the Czech nationalist cause, and changed his name to the Slavic form. After he failed to find a position in academia, Tyrš combined his experience working as a therapeutic gymnastics trainer with the nationalist ideologies he had been exposed to in Prague: the first Sokol club was formed.

The first Sokol worked to develop new Czech terminology for the training exercises, which centred on marching drills, fencing, and weightlifting. They designed a uniform that was a mélange of Slavic and revolutionary influences: brown Russian trousers, a Polish revolutionary jacket, a Montenegrin cap, and a red Garibaldi shirt. A Sokol flag, red with a white falcon, was designed by the writer Karolína Světlá (and painted by Czech artist Josef Mánes).

The Prague Sokol initially drew its leaders from the ranks of politicians and its members from the petite bourgeoisie and the working classes. The first president was Jindřich Fügner, an ethnic German who was a member of the Czech cause. Most founders were also members of the Young Czechs party, the most influential including Prince Rudolf von Thurn-Taxis, Josef Barák, and Julius and Eduard Grégr. The authorities of Austria-Hungary continually kept a close eye on the movement, but the reputation and prestige of the Sokol continued to grow; soon the Sokol members were known by most as the "Czech national army".

1860s and 1870s: Initial growth, militarization, and internal problems

Within the first year the Sokols expanded beyond Prague, first into the Moravia and the Slovenian regions of the Habsburg empire. Initially the majority of members were students and professionals, but over time there was a trend towards increasingly working class members.

The Sokol training went through periods of greater militarized training, during the Austro-Prussian War in 1866, when Sokol members were hired as guards for public events. This militaristic side of the Sokol movement continued to resurface throughout its history.

The internal issues that were to plague the Sokol movement over the years emerged almost immediately. These internal arguments reached fruition during the 1870s with the power struggle in leadership between the members of Old Czechs and the Young Czechs parties. Theoretically, the Sokol was a society “above politics.” Always flamboyantly nationalistic, the more conservative members of the Sokol argued that the organization should maintain its distance from politics while the Young Czech members advocated more direct political participation. Theoretically, the Sokol was also open equally to members of all classes. The informal “thou” (ty) was used by all members, but there were constant arguments over whether this was necessary or not. Different leaders believed that the Sokol was a mass-based institution defined by its working class members, while others viewed it more as a middle class apparatus by which to educate and raise the national consciousness of the working classes.

1880s: Slets and Sokol union

In 1882, the first slet was held. Slet came from the Czech word for "a flocking of birds" since the organization carried the name for falcon, Sokol. The same word, "slet", exists or can be synthesized from common Slavic roots in other Slavic languages. It meant a mass gymnastics (1572 Sokols) festival that became a grand tradition within the Sokol movement that spread across Central Europe together with other Slavic movements such as the political movement of Pan-Slavism. The first and subsequent slets included an elaborate welcoming ceremony at the train station, mass demonstrations, gymnastics competitions, speeches, and theatrical events, open to members of all Sokols.

In 1887 the Habsburg authorities finally allowed, after over twenty years worth of proposals, the formation of a union of Sokol clubs – Czech Sokol Community (Česká obec sokolská, ČOS). The union centralized all the Sokols in the Czech lands and sent Sokol trainers to the rest of the Slavic world to found Sokol institutions in Kraków, Ljubljana, Zagreb, Sarajevo and even the Russian Empire (FC Spartak Moscow) (mostly the Ukrainian lands).

In 1889, though officially forbidden by the authorities, members of the Prague Sokol went to the World's Fair in Paris. There they won several medals and established strong connections with French gymnasts and the French public. The Sokols have been credited with establishing the beginning of the strong French sympathy for the Czechs and their subsequent political alliances on this trip.

1890s: The progressive era
The 1890s were a progressive era for the Sokols. In order to encourage a wider range of participation, the Sokols reformed their programs, offering training sessions of varying intensities, extending their libraries, emphasizing the educational aspect of training, and starting programs for adolescents, youth, and women. There was an increasing focus on mass-based ideology and working class egalitarianism under the leadership of the Young Czechs, namely Jan Podlipný, who was also the mayor of Prague 1897–1900.

The second slet was held in 1891 (over 5,000 Sokols) and the third one soon afterwards in 1895. At this third slet the congress of the Sokol union laid out its progressive new trajectory in the St. Wenceslas Day (September 28) Resolutions. The leaders chose to continue to provide more accessible forms of training, with less focus on competition and more on an egalitarian idea of people's gymnastics balancing mental as well as physical education.

1900–1914: Competitors and neo-Slavism

The rise of the Social Democrats and agrarian parties in the political arena played out in Sokol politics as well as national ones. The Social Democrats formed a rival gymnastics society, the Workers' Gymnastics Club (DTJ).  Václav Kukař, a powerful ČOS figure, developed the policy of "cleansing" (očištění) and sought to limit membership to those who he believed demonstrated commitment to purely Czech causes. Most of the progressive members of the Sokols were purged or left voluntarily to join the DTJ. Another rival gymnast society was founded by the Christian-Socialist party under the name Orel ("Eagle"). In the face of such competition, the Sokols set about reaffirming their traditional mission under the leadership of Josef Scheiner.

The fourth slet, held in 1901 (11,000 Sokols), boasted a large international participation, including Galician Poles, Ukrainians, Slovenes, Croats, Russians, Bulgarians, Serbs, as well as Frenchmen and Americans. This slet also marked the first appearance of women who grew to be a major part of Sokol members in the following decades.

The fifth slet, held in 1907 (over 12,000 Sokols), had an increasingly Slavic focus and moved away from the more egalitarian idea of people's gymnastics with increased competition aspects. It marked the creation of the Federation of Slavic Sokols under the neo-Slavic idea of the Czechs as the strongest Slavic nation, second only to Russia.

At the 1910 meeting of the ČOS congress the sokols reaffirmed their intentions to remain "above politics" and loosened their strict membership rules to allow Social Democrats, though still not clericals, into the sokols.

In 1912, the first "All-Slavic Slet" (Všeslovanský slet, over 30,000 Sokols) was held with a largely military atmosphere, causing Augustin Očenášek (a member of Sokol) to remark, "When the thunder comes and the nations rise up to defend their existence, let it be the Sokol clubs from which the cry to battle will sound...". The cry to battle did sound two years later, when the first rumors of Franz Ferdinand's assassination reached the Sokol members, most of whom were attending a regional slet in Brno.

World War I to Communism: Continued struggle of Czech nationalism

With the onset of World War I, in 1915 the Sokols were officially disbanded. Many members were active in persuading the Czechs to defect from the Austro-Hungarian army to the Russian side. Sokol members also helped create the Czechoslovak Legions and local patrols that kept order after the disintegration of Habsburg authority, and during the creation of Czechoslovakia in October 1918. They also fulfilled their title as the "Czech national army", helping to defend Slovakia against the invasion of Béla Kun and the Hungarians.

The Sokol flourished in the early interwar period, and by 1930 had 630,000 members. The Sokols held one last slet (350,000 Sokols) on the eve of the Munich Agreement of 1938 and were later brutally suppressed and banned during the Nazi occupation of Bohemia and Moravia.

Sokol society among South Slavs

The Slovenes organized their own gymnastic society on 1. October 1863 and named it Južni Sokol (South Falcon).  Sokol societies were introduced in Slovenia by Viktor Murnik in the last decade of 19th century. V. Murnik was good gymnast. He was inspired by the Czech Sokol movement and studied Tyrš's gymnastics
bases. The 1903 All-Sokols Rally was held in Ljubljana, Slovenia. The official name of the Slovenian Sokol was Ljubljana Sokol and its starosta was Kajzelj and the coach was Murnik.

In Croatia, the Sokol movement had full support from Strossmayer, then Bishop of Đakovo. After the dissolution of Austria-Hungary and the establishment of the Kingdom of Serbs, Croats, and Slovenes in 1918, and under the leadership of Lazar Car, the Croatian Sokol societies were united with the Serbian and Slovenian Sokol clubs into a large Sokol Alliance on 15 June 1919.

The Croatian clergy forced Croatian Sokols to leave the Yugoslav Sokol Alliance in 1919–20, fueling internal conflicts within the Alliance on political grounds. At the same time, senior Catholic clergy established the Orlovi (Eagles) clerical organization with the aim of taking youths away from the Alliance. The Croatian Catholic Church rejected the pan-Slavic idea of bringing together Catholic, Orthodox, and Muslim believers under the motto that "a brother is dear regardless of his faith". The two Catholic organizations, Orlovi (Eagles) and Katolička Akcija (Catholic Action) were a main base of this resistance to the idea of Yugoslavism, brotherhood and religious tolerance. The Catholic Church's resistance to this idea of pan-Slavism led the Polish Sokols to abstain from the international All Sokol Rally held in Prague in 1926.

In the Kingdom of Yugoslavia all Sokol societies were merged into the Union of Sokols of the Kingdom of Yugoslavia as of December 1929. The Eagles were ordered to disband but they rebranded themselves as religious fraternities. This way the Sokol movement was the principal agent of the drive for cultural synthesis of the Yugoslav society. Honorary mayor of the Yugoslav Sokol was Prince Peter II.

In emigration

Members of Sokol who emigrated from Czechoslovakia set up small Sokol groups abroad.  This Sokol migration, for a variety of reasons, began even before Czechoslovakia became a nation in 1918, intensified as a result of the World Wars and the Communist suppression, and continues to this day. Bohemian, Moravian, and Slovak immigrants and Czech-American citizens started the American Sokol Organization in St. Louis Missouri in 1865, only three years after the first Prague Sokol.  Units quickly formed and by 1878, the United States had 13 Sokol chapters.

A large slet (with well over a thousand participants) was held at the just-opened Chicago World's Fair (Century of Progress) at Chicago's Soldier Field on June 25, 1933.

By 1937, American Sokol membership rolls counted nearly 20,000 adults in areas as far-flung as Baltimore, New York City, Nyack, New York, New Jersey, Pittsburgh, Chicago, Detroit, Cleveland, Oakland, Iowa, Minnesota, Nebraska, Oklahoma, St. Louis, Texas, and parts of Canada. Senator Roman Hruska of Nebraska, who was of Czech heritage, was a lifelong member of Sokol Omaha.

Aftermath

After World War II Sokols held one more slet in 1948 before they were once again suppressed, this time by the Communists. The Communist Party tried to replace the tradition of slets with mass exercises employed for propaganda purposes: Spartakiad (spartakiády) and its organization Czechoslovak Union of Physical Education. Many of the Sokol members were imprisoned or exiled but some took part in the preparation of Spartakiad.

The Sokols reappeared briefly during the Prague Spring of 1968. After years of hibernation, the Sokol movement was revived for the fourth time in 1990. A slet was held in 1994 (with 23,000 Sokols participating), after the fall of Communism.

Currently

Presently, the organization focuses on physical training in gymnastics and other athletics. Its popularity is, however, well below pre-war levels and a large percentage of members are older people with memories of the pre-1948 Sokol movement. Other members are mainly parents who register their kids for physical activities. A further slet was held in 2000 (25,000 Sokols); another was held in July 2006. In July 2012 there was celebration of 150 years of Sokol movement and in July 2018 was the 100 years anniversary of the creation of Czechoslovakia where 13,000 Sokols gathered in Prague. Slets are expected to be held every six years.

United States

Slets are also held in the United States by organizations of Czech (American Sokol Organization) and Slovak (Sokol USA) descent. The American Sokol Organization and Sokol USA alternate in hosting national slets in the United States at 4-year intervals.

The American Sokol Organization most recently hosted the XXIV ASO Slet from June 22 through June 25, 2017 in Cedar Rapids, IA. The American Sokol Organization will host the XXV ASO Slet in the summer of 2021 in the Chicago, IL suburbs. Sokol USA most recently hosted the XXVI national slet from June 29 through July 2, 2011 in Cleveland, Ohio.

Sokol USA hosted the XXVII slet, commemorating the 120th anniversary of Sokol USA, from June 29 to July 2, 2016 in Pittsburgh, PA.

Regional districts of the American Sokol Organization and Sokol USA also host smaller regional slets on an annual basis.

Catalonia
At the beginning of the twentieth century the Sokol movement was introduced in Catalonia and soon was considered as a new tradition. It bore the name of falcó (falcon in Catalan) and was influenced by the older tradition of the castellers.

Symbols

See also

 Mass games
 Pan-Slavism
 Sokol Auditorium
 Sokol in Poland
 Sokol Pavilion
 Pionýr

References

Sources
 Crampton, R. J. Eastern Europe in the Twentieth Century—and After. London: Routledge, 1997.
 Jandásek, Ladislav. "The Founder of the Sokols: Miroslav Tyrš". Slavonic and East European Review, 10 (1931/1932).
 Krüger, Arnd and Murray, William (eds.). The Nazi Olympics: Sport, Politics, and Appeasement in the 1930s. University of Illinois: 2003. p. 9.
 Nolte, Claire E. "Our Brothers across the Ocean: The Czech Sokol in America to 1914", International Journal of the History of Sport 26 (no. 13, 2009) 1963–82.
 Nolte, Claire E. The Sokol in the Czech Lands to 1914: Training for the Nation. New York: Palgrave Macmillan, 2002.
Roubal, Petr,. Spartakiads : the politics of physical culture in Communist Czechoslovakia (First English edition ed.). Czech Republic. . OCLC 1140640610.

External links

 Česká obec sokolská – official webpage of the Czech Sokol Community 
 Sokolska knjižnica – Sokol Library (Serbian/Yugoslav) at Project Rastko page 
 Historical photographs of Sokol by Šechtl and Voseček studios

 
Sports organizations of the Czech Republic
1862 establishments in the Austrian Empire
Czech culture
Physical culture